Yannick Caballero (born April 3, 1983) is a French rugby union player, currently playing for the Top 14 team Castres Olympique. He has one cap for France, which he won in 2008 coming on as a replacement against Australia in Brisbane.

Personal life
Caballero was born in France, and is of Spanish descent.

Honours

Club 
 Castres
Top 14: 2012–13

References

External links
ESPN Profile

1983 births
Living people
People from Castres
French rugby union players
France international rugby union players
French people of Spanish descent
Rugby union flankers
Sportspeople from Tarn (department)
US Montauban players
Castres Olympique players